Western Sea may refer to:

 Admiral of the Western Seas, Zheng He, of the Ming Dynasty of China
 , a U.S. Navy ship name
 , a United States Navy cargo ship in commission from 1918 to 1919
 , a steam cargo ship built in 1918 and scrapped in 1931
 2010 Western Sea conflict, in Korea's Western Sea, the Yellow Sea

See also

 Western Sea Frontier
 Western Seaboard (disambiguation)
 West Sea (disambiguation), an alternative name for several bodies of water
 
 Battle of Yeonpyeong (disambiguation), aka, Battle of the Western Sea
 Western (disambiguation)
 Sea (disambiguation)
 Western sea-purslane (Sesuvium verrucosum) a species of flowering plant